Alex Cubis is an Australian actor and attorney, known for his roles on Netflix fantasy series Mako Mermaids, eOne drama Between Two Worlds and Tyler Perry drama series Ruthless. Cubis has also appeared in Dear White People, Rake and Unverified for Funny or Die. He was named one of Who Magazine’s Sexiest People.

Education 
Cubis attended St. Aloysius' College, where he was Dux. He then received a scholarship to study a Bachelor of Arts/Bachelor of Laws at the University of Sydney where he was an editor on the Social Justice Law Review, and resided at St. Andrew's College. While a student, he was signed to Chadwick Models. In the United States, Cubis passed the New York Bar Exam.

Career 
In 2015, Cubis starred as Erik in series 2 of Mako: Island of Secrets (known internationally as Mako Mermaids). The series was created by Jonathan M. Shiff and streams on Netflix.

Cubis thereafter played a leading role in the world premiere of the National Theatre production at Riverside Theatres of The Incredible Here and Now alongside Caroline Brazier, which was directed by Wayne Harrison.

In the United States, Cubis was cast in feature films opposite Oscar-nominee Sally Kirkland in Hope for the Holidays and Lenny Von Dohlen and Estella Warren in Just Within Reach.

In 2019, Cubis joined the cast of Seven Network’s Between Two Worlds, directed by Kriv Stenders and created by Bevan Lee. The series was released in 2020 and was acquired by Entertainment One for international distribution. Cubis was named the series' "breakout star."

In 2021, Cubis joined the cast of Tyler Perry drama, Ruthless.

Other work 
Cubis hosted the podcast Honest Conversations for Nova Entertainment and also produced the film project Rocket Man.

He was an ambassador for the 2020 MEN-tality project and Beyond Blue, alongside David Wenham, Ryan Corr and Guy Sebastian.

Filmography

Film

Television

Theatre

External links

References 

Year of birth missing (living people)
Living people
Male actors from Sydney
Lawyers from Sydney
University of Sydney alumni
Sydney Law School alumni